Club Almagro is an Argentine sports club from José Ingenieros, Buenos Aires, although its headquarters are in the Almagro district. The football team currently plays in the Primera Nacional, the second division of the Argentine football league system.

History

Almagro was founded on January 6, 1911, in the Almagro neighbourhood of Buenos Aires. The club still has its sports facilities there for its members, but the football stadium (with a capacity of 19,000) is located in José Ingenieros, in the Tres de Febrero Partido of Greater Buenos Aires.

In 1919 there was a new splitting in Argentine football, so both leagues were played at the same time: official Asociación Argentina de Football (with one of Almagro predecessors, Columbian, as one of its teams) and dissident "Asociación Amateurs de Football". During that season, Columbian was going through a severe economic crisis, disputing its last game v. Boca Juniors in the 6th fixture. Some executives of recently promoted Club Almagro, leadered by Miguel de Zárate made Columbial a merger proposal, which was accepted.

Therefore, Almagro renamed "Sportivo Almagro" and continued playing in Primera División (debuting in the 7th fixture vs Platense) under its new denomination, which avoided the club to be disaffiliated.

Almagro played one year in first division in 1938 after winning the first second division tournament that awarded a promotion. Later the team won the 1968 second division tournament, but had to participate in the "reclasificatorio" tournament with first division teams and other second division teams and didn't win promotion.

The Tricolores played most of the time in second division, a few years in third division, but in 2000 and 2004 they won the promotion to Primera División, only to be relegated both times after only one season playing at the top level.

In 2000 Almagro returned to Primera División after beating Instituto de Córdoba by 1–0 (2–1 on aggregate) at relegation playoffs (named "Promoción" in Argentina).

Players

Out on loan

Former players

  Luciano Cigno
  Leonardo Costas

Honours
Primera B (2): 1937, 1968 
Primera C (1): 1971

References

External links

 
 Almagro 100
 Digital Magazine

 
Association football clubs established in 1911
1911 establishments in Argentina
Football clubs in Buenos Aires